Events from the year 1843 in Canada.

Incumbents
Monarch: Victoria

Federal government
Parliament: 1st

Governors
Governor General of the Province of Canada: Charles Poulett Thomson, 1st Baron Sydenham
Governor of New Brunswick: William MacBean George Colebrooke
Governor of Nova Scotia: Lucius Cary, 10th Viscount Falkland
Civil Governor of Newfoundland: John Harvey
Governor of Prince Edward Island: Henry Vere Huntley

Premiers
Joint Premiers of the Province of Canada —
William Henry Draper, Canada West Premier
Samuel Harrison, Canada East Premier

Events
January 19 – Mount Allison University is founded.
September 1 – First Prime Minister of Canada Sir John A. Macdonald marries Isabella Clark
December 9 – Bishop's University is founded.

Full date unknown
Fort Victoria built by British to strengthen their claim to Vancouver Island.
David Thompson sends a set of refined maps to London.
Lord Metcalfe comes to Montreal.
The Cornwall and Chambly Canals are opened.
Survey of Boundary, between the U.S. and Canada, is begun.
Grace Marks is controversially convicted of murder after her trial on November 3 and 4, 1843. The crime and trial will form the basis for Margaret Atwood's novel Alias Grace in 1996.

Births

January to June
February 3 – William Cornelius Van Horne, pioneering railway executive (died 1915)
February 10 – Jean Blanchet, politician (died 1908)
March 16 – James Mitchell, politician and 7th Premier of New Brunswick (died 1897)
May 2 – Elijah McCoy, inventor and engineer (died 1929)
May 17 – Robert Beith, politician (died 1922)
June 1 – David Howard Harrison, farmer, physician, politician and 6th Premier of Manitoba (died 1905)

July to December

August 4 – Joseph-Guillaume Bossé, politician and lawyer (died 1908)
September 30 – Samuel Barton Burdett, politician, lawyer and lecturer (died 1892)
October 2 – James Whitney, politician and 6th Premier of Ontario (died 1914)
October 25 – Thomas Simpson Sproule, politician and Speaker of the House of Commons of Canada (died 1917)
December 3 – William Dillon Otter, soldier and first Canadian-born Chief of the General Staff (died 1929)
December 6 – William Wilfred Sullivan, journalist, jurist, politician and Premier of Prince Edward Island (died 1920)

Deaths
February 26 (baptised) – William Carson (born 1770)
September 16 – Ezekiel Hart, entrepreneur, politician, and first Jew to be elected to public office in the British Empire (born 1767)
October 6 – Sir Archibald Campbell, 1st Baronet, army officer and colonial administrator (born 1769)

References

 
Canada
Years of the 19th century in Canada
1843 in North America